David Andújar Jiménez (born 21 August 1991) is a Spanish footballer who plays as a central defender for Tianjin Jinmen Tiger.

Club career
Born in Torrejón de Ardoz, Madrid, Andújar was an AD Torrejón CF youth graduate, making his senior debut for the club in 2009, in the regional leagues. In 2012 he signed for CD Coslada, remaining in the lower levels.

A regular starter and captain for Coslada, Andújar returned to the fourth division after signing for CD Móstoles URJC on 2 July 2016. The following 17 June, he agreed to a contract with Segunda División B side CF Rayo Majadahonda.

An immediate first-choice, Andújar contributed with three goals in 34 appearances during the campaign as his side achieved promotion to Segunda División for the first time ever. After sustaining an injury, he made his professional debut on 11 November, starting in a 2–0 home defeat of UD Almería.

On 11 July 2019, after suffering relegation, Andújar signed a two-year deal with FC Cartagena in the third division. He helped the club in their promotion to the second division in 2020, being a regular starter.

On 20 March 2022, Andújar left the Efesé after the club announced his transfer to an unnamed foreign club.

References

External links

1991 births
Living people
People from Torrejón de Ardoz
Spanish footballers
Footballers from the Community of Madrid
Association football defenders
Segunda División players
Segunda División B players
Tercera División players
Divisiones Regionales de Fútbol players
CD Móstoles URJC players
CF Rayo Majadahonda players
FC Cartagena footballers